Paul Rogers (born 20 April 1956) is an English bassist.

Career
Rogers is best known as a member of improvising jazz group Mujician but has also released a number of solo records.

Selected discography
 1986 – Gheim (Emanem) with Paul Rutherford
 1989 – Listen (Emanem) solo
 1995 – Heron Moon (Rare Music) solo
 1996 – Rogues (Emanem) with Paul Rutherford
 1998 – The First Full Turn (Emanem) with RoTToR (Paul Rutherford, Julie Tippett, Keith Tippett, Rogers)
 2001 – The Ayes Have It (Emanem) with Evan Parker
 2007 – Being (Amor Fati) solo
 2007 – Two Loose (FMR) with Edward Perraud
 2009 – Tetralogy (Emanem) with Paul Rutherford
 2017 – In Backward Times (Emanem) with Paul Rutherford
 2018 – Bag of Screams (Setola di Maiale) with Emil Gross

References

1956 births
Living people
People from Chester
British jazz bass guitarists
Mujician members
Emanem Records artists
FMR Records artists